The 2008 Hungarian Figure Skating Championships took place on January 10, 2008 in Budapest. Skaters competed in the disciplines of men's singles, ladies' singles, pair skating, and ice dancing on the senior level. The results were used to choose the Hungarian teams to the 2008 World Championships and the 2008 European Championships.

Results

Men

Ladies

Pairs

Ice dancing

External links
 results

Hungarian Figure Skating Championships
2007 in figure skating
Hungarian Figure Skating Championships, 2008
Figure skating